or its translated terms (Mature, Matur) is a Latin name for the secondary school exit exam or "maturity diploma" in various European countries, including Albania, Austria, Bosnia and Herzegovina, Bulgaria, Croatia, Czechia, Hungary, Italy, Kosovo, Liechtenstein, Montenegro, North Macedonia, Poland, Serbia, Slovakia, Slovenia, Switzerland and Ukraine.

In Albania
The official name is Matura Shtetërore (State Matura) which was introduced in 2006 by the Ministry of Education and Science replacing the school based Provimet e Pjekurisë (Maturity Examination). The Matura is the obligatory exam after finishing the gjimnaz (secondary school) to have one's education formally recognized and to become eligible to enroll in universities. Vocational schools, art schools and schools participating in pilot programs are part of the Matura with different exam structures and subjects. The Matura is a centralized affair, conducted by the QSHA (Center for Educational Services) which is in charge of selecting tasks, appointing national examiners, grading the sheets; other agencies ensure the safety and integrity of the exams.

The three compulsory subjects to complete secondary education are Albanian language and literature, mathematics and a foreign language (English, except for students in dual-language schools). Students in high schools must also take one additional exam which they choose themselves out of a list of eight subjects. The Matura exams take place in four separate days usually in the June/July period. The first three days are for each of the compulsory subjects; the fourth day is for the additional exam. The basic marks range from 4 to 10 where a 5 is the lowest passing mark; applicants fill out forms indicating their preferred universities with no ranking between them. The State Matura replaced an admission system conducted individually by each faculty/university which was seen as abusive.

In Austria

The official term for Matura in Austria is Reifeprüfung. The document received after the successful completion of the written and oral exams is called Maturazeugnis.

In the Gymnasium (AHS), which, as opposed to vocational schools, focuses on general education, the Matura consists of three to four written exams (referred to as Klausurarbeiten, four to five hours each) to be taken on consecutive mornings (usually in May) and two to three oral exams to be taken on the same half-day about a month later (usually in June); The higher vocational education schools (BHS) such as HBLAs, HTLs, and HTBLAs follow a similar format. All examinations are held at the school which the candidate last attended. Candidates have the option to write a scholarly paper (called Fachbereichsarbeit) to be submitted at the beginning of the February preceding the final exams, which, if accepted, reduces the number of written exams by one, as the Fachbereichsarbeit is seen as an equivalent to a subject. This paper also needs to be defended in the corresponding oral exam.

The grading system is the one universally used in Austrian schools: 1 (sehr gut) is excellent; 2 (gut) is good; 3 (befriedigend) is satisfactory; 4 (genügend) is passed and 5 (nicht genügend) means that the candidate has failed. In addition, a candidate's Maturazeugnis contains a formalized overall assessment: "mit ausgezeichnetem Erfolg bestanden" (pass with distinction: an average of 1.5 or better, no grade above 3), "mit gutem Erfolg bestanden" (pass with merit: an average of 2.0 or better, no grade above 3), "bestanden" (pass: no grade above 4); and '"nicht bestanden" (fail: at least one grade 5). Candidates who have failed may re-take their exams in September/October or February/March of the following school year.

Compulsory subjects for the written finals are always German and Mathematics, as well as a foreign language (usually English, French, Spanish, Italian, Latin or sometimes Ancient Greek). Schools with a focus on science may require their students to take written finals in Biology or Physics.

The Austrian "Matura" used to be a decentralized affair, however since 2014 tests in Mathematics, German and foreign languages, are now centralized and held at the same day throughout Austria. There is only one external examiner: candidates are set tasks both for their written and oral finals by their own (former) teachers. Formally, however, there is an examination board consisting of a candidate's teachers/examiners, the headmaster/headmistress and one external Vorsitzende(r) (head), usually a high-ranking school official or the head of another school. Oral exams are held publicly, but attendance by anyone other than a candidate's former schoolmates is not encouraged, and indeed rare.

It is possible for Austrians of all age groups to take the Matura. Adults from their twenties on are usually tutored at private institutions of adult education before taking their final tests, held separately before a regional examination board.

The new centralized Matura (Zentralmatura)
In 2015, the old Matura system was replaced by a new concept called Zentralmatura (centralized Matura). Graduation exams are now put together by bifie (an institution for research in education) and every graduation exam in Austria is now held on the same day. However, the teachers still correct all the exams themselves using an answer sheet that is included in the exam packages.

Students can still choose either four or three written exams (maths, German and one foreign language are compulsory; one additional language can also be chosen). When students choose three written exams, they will have to do another three oral exams. When choosing four written exams, only two additional oral exams are necessary.

What is also new is that every student now has to write a graduation paper called VWA (Vorwissenschaftliche Arbeit or, literally translated, "Pre-scientific paper"). They can choose any topic they want, usually one year before graduating. When they have finished writing it (it should usually be 30.000 to 60.000 characters long), they have to present it to teachers and to the head (Vorsitzende(r)). The VWA is another grade in the Maturazeugnis.

In Bulgaria
In Bulgarian the matura is formally called държавен зрелостен изпит (Romanization: darzhaven zrelosten izpit, State Maturity Exam) or ДЗИ (DZI), but usually it is called simply матура. There is only one compulsory subject – Bulgarian Language and Literature, but students are required to select an additional subject of their choice; they can also request a third and fourth subject. Each exam consists of a single written test. The second subject must be chosen between:
 A foreign language (English, French, German, Spanish, Italian, Russian)
 Mathematics
 Physics and astronomy
 Biology and health education
 Chemistry and environmental science
 History and civilization
 Geography and economics
 cycle of "Philosophy"

In 2008, according to the statistics on the web site of the Bulgarian Ministry of Education, 76,013 students have registered for the matura exams. Of them only 1748 students registered for a third, voluntary subject. Only 845 of them passed the third examination successfully. Because of the exam's challenging nature, students who request a third subject have a significant advantage in the university admissions process.

In Croatia

The nationwide leaving exams (državna matura) were introduced for gymnasium (and other four-year high school programme) students in the school year 2009/2010. The examinations are conducted by the National Center for External Evaluation of Education (Nacionalni centar za vanjsko vrednovanje obrazovanja – NCVVO). There are two available terms during which candidates can take their exams: the summer term, taking place usually during June, and the fall term, typically occurring during September. Many university faculties and other higher-education institutions already have their applications closed by the end of the summer term due to having reached their first-year students enrollment quota for the upcoming academic year.

The compulsory subjects are available at the basic (B) or higher (A) level exams. Certain higher-education institutions require the candidate to take certain or all compulsory subject exams at the A level. On the other hand, there are higher-education programmes requiring only the B level exams. In such cases, the candidate taking an exam in a certain subject on the A level is credited more points than a candidate taking the B level exam: 1 point of the A level exam is worth 1.6 points of the B level exam.

The three compulsory subjects are:
 Croatian (or Serbian, Hungarian, Italian or Czech for minorities), 
 Mathematics,
 a foreign language (English, German, Italian, Spanish or French). Students can only take the exam in a language that they had a positive grade in for at least two years of their high school education. Students of classical gymnasiums are therefore also able to choose Latin or Ancient Greek instead of (or in addition to) a modern foreign language.

The Croatian language exam has two parts: literature written exam, and an essay. The literature exam is composed mostly of the multiple choice assignments and matching questions assignments, whereas the essay part of the exam requires an essay ranging from 400 to 600 words written with notable understanding of a given literature text.

The literature appearing in the exam changes annually; however, the list of works that can appear remains the same. The B level exam literature list consists of the following: Camus' The Stranger, Cesarić's Lirika, Gundulić's Dubravka, Ibsen's A Doll's House, Krleža's The Glembays, Matoš's Pjesme, Novak's Posljednji Stipančići, and Sophocles' Antigone. The A level works are: Camus' Stranger, Dostoyevsky's Crime and Punishment, Držić's Dundo Maroje, Flaubert's Madame Bovary, Goethe's The Sorrows of Young Werther, Kafka's The Metamorphosis, Krleža's The Glembays and The Return of Filip Latinovicz, Marinković's Ruke, Nehajev's Bijeg, Poe's The Black Cat, Salinger's The Catcher in the Rye, Sophocles' Antigone, Šimić's Preobraženja, and Šoljan's Kratki izlet.

The optional subjects are Biology, Chemistry, Computer science, Ethics, Geography, History, Logics, Music, Philosophy, Physics, Politics, Psychology, Religious studies,  Sociology, and Visual arts. Optional subjects are available only at a single level. A gymnasium student is considered to have finished their high school education program upon passing only the three compulsory subjects (alongside fulfilling the other prerequisites set by their high school); if a student fails a Matura exam on an optional subject, that subject simply won't be listed on their certificate.

Students receive their exams in sealed opaque silver bags which they personally open typically by piercing the top with a pen and thus breaking the seal. Inside they get the exam booklet, the answer sheet (used for scanning students' answers for faster grading process), a concept booklet, a new opaque silver bag, and a piece of paper with barcode stickers used for candidate identification. Before they start taking the exam, students need to stick the barcodes on every booklet, paper and bag that they received. At the end, students gather all the examination material and seal it in the opaque silver bag they had received, which will then be sent back to NCVVO for grading. The answers of the exam questions are published typically two days after the exam day.

Examinees are allowed to file a complaint on grading, or even on the exam questions. On the 2012 Croatian language exam, a total of 7 exam questions were nullified due to multiple possible interpretations of the source text and the indiscrimination by the examinees shown by the psychometric analysis.

Further enrollment into higher education is conducted on-line via the National Computer System for Applications for Higher Education Institutions (Nacionalni informacijski sustav prijava na visoka učilišta – NISpVU). Each candidate has the right to attempt to enroll at a maximum of 10 colleges, faculties, schools, and academies of universities, or other types of higher-education institutions. Lists of students with the right to enrollment are processed by the central computers of each institution's division. The rank is formed based on Matura exams points and optional additional criteria or extra points set by the institution that ranks the applicants, for example, admission exams, or GPA of final grades of each year in certain or all high school subjects.

For example, for a domestic student to enroll at the School of Medicine, University of Zagreb, the following criteria needs to be met: they have acquired at least 55% on the compulsory admission exam (select advanced areas in Chemistry, Biology and Physics), and they have passed the A level exams of the compulsory Matura subjects. Their final points are then calculated based on the following:
 the compulsory admission exam (60%),
 the A level Matura exams: Croatian (10%), Mathematics (4%), foreign language (10%),
 grade point average in all high school subjects (16%).

In the Czech Republic
The official term for matura in the Czech Republic is maturita or maturitní zkouška. In 2010 the Czech Republic introduced a system of state exams, which divided the previous system into two parts. The first is the state exam, which consists of two compulsory subjects: Czech language and literature and either a foreign language (mostly English, but also German, Russian, Spanish or French) or mathematics (the combination is chosen by students). The second part consists of Czech language and literature and at least two, but usually three, "profile" subjects, which vary between schools. Gymnázium (similar to grammar school) students usually choose from:
 Biology
 Chemistry
 Foreign language
 Geography
 History
 Information Technologies
 Mathematics
 Physics
 Social Sciences (usually includes psychology, sociology, economics, law, political science, philosophy and international relations)

The state part of the exam is supervised by CERMAT (formerly Centrum pro reformu maturitní zkoušky, "Centre for Maturita Reform; now Centrum pro zjišťování výsledků vzdělávání, "Centre for Detection of Education Results"), a state managed company. CERMAT issues final tests for the state part of the exam, documentation and practical tests, holds training for teachers who correct essays and supervise the students during the exams. The main part of the company is the tech centre, which is used for auto correcting the students exams. State exams are subject to continual improvement. Today the tests consist of four exams from which two are state organized and two school organized, in the future the state wants to add at least one more state exam and one more compulsory school exam.

In 2012 the state part of the maturita exam was split into two difficulty levels – students could choose between basic and advanced tests. This solution was found to be ineffective and was canceled the following year.

The Czech Republic also has a separate examination system called Národní srovnávací zkoušky ("National Comparative Test"), owned and managed by the private company Scio, s.r.o. which provides tests for all subjects. Some Czech universities recognize the results of these tests and students can be accepted based on these results, however, they still have to succeed in the maturita exam.

The examination itself is also divided between written and oral parts but not all subjects require both written and spoken input (for example math is formed by a written test only). Usually both the written and the oral part of the exam are set in late spring. The state part of the written exam is set to one day in which students in the whole country write identical tests, different tests are always issued on the day the exam takes place. The school (profile) part is always different and is based on requirements of the school which issues the test so it may be both written and spoken, but it can also be only one of the options.

The oral part of the maturita exam takes part in a classroom in which a commissioner must be present. The oral exam is divided into two 15 minute parts (except Czech language and literature, where the preparation time is 20 minutes), first a student draws a number of his question and then begins 15 minutes of preparation often called potítko ("sweat lodge") after the first 15 minutes he is called in to the 15 minute oral exam. The commission is composed of the class teacher, commissioner and either a principal or a representative principal. The student is examined by the examiner and an assessor. The examiner and the assessor usually agree on a grade which should be assigned to the student and if not the commission takes a vote for the grade. Students can graduate with a grade better than 5 (grades are 1–5, where 1 is the best).

Exam duration, for both oral and written exams, as well as preparation time, can be longer for students with disabilities.

If students fail in one subject, they have the option to repeat the subject, if they fail more than one subject, then they have to repeat the complete set of exams including the written part. All students have a maximum of three attempts to succeed in this exam, if they fail to succeed they end secondary school without the maturita and are unable to apply for college or university. They still have a chance to do maturita exam on another secondary school in the future, but this mostly means that they should finish study on that another school in full length, e.g. 4 years.

In Hungary
The official term for the matura exam in Hungary is "érettségi vizsga" or simply "érettségi". It is usually taken after 12 or 13 years of schooling, at the age of 17 to 19, but may also be taken at a later age. Candidates who pass their final exams (school-leaving exams) receive a document that contains their grades and which enables them to go to a university.

Hungarian students have to take an exam from Hungarian literature and grammar ("magyar nyelv és irodalom"), Mathematics ("matematika"), History ("történelem"), one foreign language ("idegen nyelv"), and one more subject of the student's choice that can be anything that the student had learned for at least 2 years in school. While these five subject are mandatory for obtaining a degree, candidates may choose as many additional exam subjects as they wish. Students can choose between standard (közép) or higher (emelt) level for each subject. The exams don't necessarily have to be taken in Hungarian; at the candidate's request, they can be taken in any language (with the exception of Hungarian literature and grammar for obvious reasons).

The Hungarian literature and grammar, History, the Sciences (e.g. biology) and foreign language exams are made up of a written and an oral part, while the standard-level Mathematics exam contains only a written part. (Should a candidate fail their standard-level Mathematics exam, they can have an oral exam in order to pass). The higher-level Mathematics exam consists of both a written and an oral part.

The grading scale of the érettségi is the same as the usual grading used in Hungarian schools but the percentages differ: excellent (5), good (4), medium (3), pass (2), and fail (1).

In Italy
In Italy the examination is commonly called (Esame di) Maturità ('maturity exam') or just Esame di Stato ('state exam'), but the official name is Esame di Stato conclusivo del corso di studio di istruzione secondaria superiore ('Final state exam of the upper secondary cycle of studies'). This is the final exam for secondary school, which students are normally required to pass in order to be admitted to colleges and universities.

In Italy, the maturità is informally regarded as a rite of passage from adolescence to adulthood, after which secondary school graduates get ready for higher education and/or a job.

Examination boards are composed of three internal teachers belonging to the student's school, three external teachers and an external president of the board. Every year the Ministry of Education decides which subjects will be assigned to external teachers; these are different depending on the type of school.

The exam is divided into written and oral sections. The written section consists of three tests. The first one is Italian and is identical nationwide: students are required to write an essay, an article on a given topic, but they can also choose to analyse and comment on a text (usually a poem). The second test changes according to the type of school the student attended, so it can be on a wide variety of different subjects, such as pedagogy and psychology, mathematics, foreign language, Latin, and Ancient Greek. It is identical nationwide for schools of the same type. The subject is decided by the Ministry a few months before the exam: it is almost always the same for some types of school (for example Mathematics for liceo scientifico) and it is chosen among the "written" subjects for other schools (for example, it is chosen between Latin and Ancient Greek for liceo classico or one of the three different foreign languages studied, included English, in liceo linguistico). Finally, the third test is about a maximum of five selected subjects of the last year, and it is written by every single examining commission. The student doesn't know before which subjects are in the text. Starting the school year 2018–2019 the third test will be abolished leaving the first and the second written tests and the oral test. The interview section is to assess that the student has really reached a personal and intellectual maturity concerning the various subjects of his or her last school year; the examining commission is supposed to ask about every subject, but has got to make sure that the candidate is also able to discuss about a variety of themes explaining and justifying his or her opinion; also, in recent years has become customary for each student to prepare a short essay (tesina) on a free topic, intended to showcase the ability to cover different sides of the topic using extensively the notions and methods learnt in school.

The scoring has been changed various times since 1969:
1969–1998: pass 36, maximum 60
1999–2006: pass 60, maximum 100 (45 + 35 + 20)
2007–2008: pass 60, maximum 100 cum laude (40 + 45 + 30)
2009–2018: pass 60, maximum 100 cum laude (45 + 30 + 25)
2019: pass 60, maximum 100 cum laude (40 + 20 + 40)

The score is calculated by adding up:
 Credits: up to 25 points from school grades; the top score is assigned to students who have an average above 9 out of 10. Starting the school year 2018–2019 up to 40 points.
 Written exam: the pass mark is of 30 points out of 45. The candidate sits 3 written tests. For each one the passing mark is 10 points out of 15. Starting the school year 2018–2019 up to 40 points. The candidate sits 2 written tests. For each one up to 20 points.
 Oral exam: the passing mark is 20 points out of 30. Starting the school year 2018–2019 up to 20 points.
 Bonus: an extra 5 points can be awarded to the candidate by the examining commission. In order to get this bonus, candidates must have received at least 15 credits and the sum of their oral and written exams must be at least 70.

The students who are able to reach 100 points without needing a bonus can be awarded the "lode" (cum laude) praise by the examination board.

In Kosovo
In Kosovo Testi i Maturës Shtetërore/Državni maturski ispit (the State Mature Exam) is mandatory for every high school student in order to get the high school certificate. Without passing the Matura Exam, one cannot apply to any university within Kosovo. It has different number of questions per subject, depending on the High School's profile.

It is held every year in June, and with the latest reforms, there are two tests, on two different days:

 the First one has 100 questions, and has questions about general subjects;
 the Second one has 100 questions, and has professional subjects questions.

The tests are held on the same day for every school, usually in the middle of June. There is also a similar test for the Primary School pupils as well, called Testi i Semi-Maturës Shtetërore/Državni malomaturski ispit (State Semi-Matura Exam) which has 100 questions, and is mandatory for every pupil who will continue to High School.
The Tests are provided by the Ministry of Education, Science and Technology, and are in Albanian, Serbian, Turkish and Bosniak, who make the ethnical groups of Kosovo.

In North Macedonia
In North Macedonia the matura is obligatory for every high school student who is planning on going to college afterwards. It is called државна матура ("state matura") or simply матура ("matura"). Every student who intends to pass the matura is required to complete four exams:
 Native language (either Macedonian, Albanian or Turkish): demonstrating knowledge of literature and grammar of the four-year high school studying, as well as essay writing.
 Mathematics/foreign language: students choose whether they will take mathematics (basic or advanced level) or a foreign language (typically English, German, French or Russian).
 two subjects by student's choice (subjects available, beside the aforementioned ones, Biology, Chemistry, Physics, Geography, Sociology, Informatics, Latin, Art, Music, History, Philosophy, Business etc)
 a project task

In Poland

In the Polish education system, the exam is officially called egzamin maturalny, but it is commonly known as matura. It is taken on completion of high school, in May (with additional dates in June, and retakes available in August). The exam is not compulsory, although Polish students must pass it in order to be able to apply for higher education courses in Poland and elsewhere.

A major reform of the exam (originally enacted in 1999, although its introduction was delayed) came into effect as from 2005. Under the old system (popularly called stara matura) candidates' performance was assessed solely by teachers from their own schools. In the new system (nowa matura) written work is assessed by independent examiners. This is considered to make the results more objective, and as a result Polish higher education institutions no longer run entrance exams (as they did under the old system), but base their admissions primarily on matura results.

As of 2015, every student taking the matura takes three compulsory exams at "basic level" (poziom podstawowy) in:
Polish (including knowledge of Polish and European literature)
A selected modern language (English, French, German, Italian, Spanish or Russian)
Mathematics
as well as at least one subject at "extended level" (poziom rozszerzony). These include the above as well as biology, chemistry, geography, social studies, history, history of art, history of music, information technology, physics and astronomy, Latin and Ancient History, philosophy, another modern language, languages of ethnic groups in Poland (Belarusian, Lithuanian, Ukrainian), Kashubian and Lemko.

Exams in Polish and other languages include both a written paper and an oral examination.

Results are currently expressed as percentages. To pass the matura it is necessary to score at least 30% in each of the three compulsory exams, and from 2023, in at least one "extended level" subject. The results of the additional exams do not affect whether a student passes, but are usually a factor when applying for higher education places. Since the year 2015 the results are expressed not only as percentages, but are also accompanied by percentiles on the Matura certificate. This aims to make comparisons between Matura scores from different years fairer.

The exams are conducted by the Central Examination Board (Centralna Komisja Egzaminacyjna; CKE), assisted by a number of Regional Examination Boards (Okręgowa Komisja Egzaminacyjna; OKE). The same bodies also conduct tests for pupils completing primary school.

A custom associated with the matura is the studniówka, a ball organized for students and their teachers approximately one hundred days before the examinations begin. Following a popular superstition, candidates (particularly female ones) wear red underwear at the ball, and then wear the same items for the exam itself, to bring luck.

In Serbia
Matura is an obligatory exam at the end of primary school and high school. The exam taken at the end of primary school is called  (Minor) while the one at the end of high school is called  (Major). 

For  there are three exams: 

 Serbian language
 Mathematics
 and a combined one consisting of questions about biology, geography, history, chemistry and physics.

For  (Major) exams depends on type of the school where student is taking an exam. In classical gymnasiums these three exams are taken:

 Serbian language
 Mathematics
 And a third test where students choose to take two exams, where they have to choose between these: physics, chemistry, history, philosophy, psychology, sociology, informatics, musicology or art.

In technical or medical schools these exams are taken:

 Serbian language
 Mathematics
 Third exam depends on the school where student is taking an exam. It could be any type of technician-type exam or medicine-related exam, depends on a school.
In Serbian matura's there's no grading or statistic system in which was presented did student fail or not. In Serbia, highschools and universities have point-system where student needs to have higher number of points. The points are checked on Serbian government's website for highschools, for new highschool students and for universities, they have their own website for point-scailing.

In Slovakia 
In Slovakia the matura is formally called Maturitná skúška. It consists of one to three distinct parts, depending on the subject. The first section is the External Section and is not required by all subjects. The second section is the Internal Section, it may have one or two subsections, the first one is the written subsection, which is not required by all subjects, and the second one is the verbal subsection, which is required by all subjects. All the sections of matura take place either in the "proper" term, which ranges from March to June, or in an "extraordinary" term, which may be from April to May, or September, or February of the next year.

The first part consists of the External Section. The subjects that include it are: the first foreign language (English, French, German, Russian, Spanish, and Italian), mathematics, Slovak language and literature, Slovak language and Slovak literature, Hungarian language and literature, and Ukrainian language and literature. This section is usually held in March. This sections consists of a multiple choice and short answer test. The tests are prepared and electronically assessed by NÚCEM (National Institute for Certified Educational Measurements). The test for the External Section of a given subject has a start time that is the same for the whole of Slovakia and students are supervised by external employees (not employees of the school the test is taking place).

The second part consists of the written subsection of the Internal Section. The subjects which include the written subsection are: Slovak language and literature, Slovak language and Slovak literature, Hungarian language and literature, and Ukrainian language and literature. This subsection consists of one "long answer" question, where a student either receives a theme, or four themes from which they pick one, and then they write an essay in the corresponding language. The length of the essay is based on the proficiency CEFR level of the student. B1 – 160 – 180 words, B2 – 200 – 220 words, C1 – 260 – 320 words, native language (usually Slovak) – 1.5 – 3 A4 pages. The essay themes of a given subject have a start time that is the same for the whole of Slovakia and students are supervised by external employees (not employees of the school the test is taking place). Afterwards essays are evalued by each school according to central criteria.

The third part consists of the verbal subsection of the Internal Section. All subjects include this part. It is usually held in May. Schools create, supervise, and evaluate this part internally. Each subject has its maturita commission, which will create 25 assignments, which each have 3 questions. Afterwards, the school's principal will approve these based on recommendations from the commission's chairman. Students must bring a government issued ID card to prove their identity.

When taking part in matura, students choose or are assigned a proficiency level for their foreign language of choice depending on the school type and student skill. Students of gymnasium schools have to choose at least one foreign language at level B2. Students of linguist-specialized (bilingual) gymnasium schools and students in bilingual classes are assigned the C1 level for the foreign language they are focused on. In the past, if the student had gotten an additional certificate from foreign language (IELTS, TOEFL, CAE, FCE), at least at level B1, they did not need to pass the foreign language exam. However, this was changed in 2014, and now all secondary education students are required to pass the foreign language exam as a part of their matura.

Required subjects for each student depend on the type of school a they attend. Usually 4 subjects are required depending on the native language of the student. For gymnasiums, these are: native language (usually Slovak) and literature, a foreign language, and 2 subjects chosen by the student, if the student is a part of an official national minority, in addition to their native language, they are required to choose either Slovak language and literature, or Slovak language and Slovak literature instead of 1 of the 2 choosable subjects. For the first choosable subject, the student must have a cumulative minimum of 6 weekly classes of that subject, or one that falls under the same category (for example, a student may have had 2 classes of math each week for 4 years, this would give them a cumulative total of 8 math classes). Students of bilingual gymnasium schools may have to choose up to 5 additional subjects instead of the regular 2. For schools with a dual education system (stredné odborné školy), these are: native language (usually Slovak) and literature, a foreign language, theoretical part of the subject the school is focused on, and a practical part of the subject the school is focused on, if the student is a part of an official national minority, they are required to choose either Slovak language and literature, or Slovak language and Slovak in addition to the other subjects. Some dual education system schools may offer a "postmatura education", in which case, the student has already completed matura in the past, and therefore, their only subjects for matura are the theoretical part of the subject the school is focused on, and the practical part of the subject the school is focused on. A student may choose to take part in any number of subjects in addition to the ones they are required to choose.

If a student fails, doesn't show up without an accepted excuse, does "unacceptable behaviour" (cheating or exhibiting improper behaviour) during the external exam, or refuses to answer one of the questions in the vocal part, one of the required subjects, they are able to redo the matura in one of the extraordinary terms (unless unacceptable behaviour), or try again in the next year's term. If a student fails, doesn't show up, or refuses to answer one of the questions in the vocal part of one of their extra subjects, that subject is not included in their final report, if however, they receive a passing, but unfavourable result from one of their extra subjects, they are not able to exclude it from their final report.

In Slovenia
In Slovenia, the splošna matura (college-prep leaving exam) is an obligatory exam after finishing gimnazija (upper secondary school) to have one's education formally recognised and to become eligible to enroll in colleges and universities. It should not be confused with the poklicna matura (vocational leaving exam), which is the final examination at vocational schools and does not lead to university studies. Since there is no entrance examination at the vast majority of Slovenian universities programmes (notable exceptions are only art and music programmes, architecture studies and sports studies), the score on this exam is the main criterion for admission (grades achieved during studies also play a small part).

It consists of three compulsory and two elective subjects. One must take Slovene (Italian or Hungarian for members of minorities), Mathematics and one foreign language (usually English, although French, German, Spanish, Russian, and Italian are provided, as well). The elective subjects can be chosen among all the other subjects, one has encountered during his schooling (Greek, Latin, physics, chemistry, biology, geography, history or history of art, philosophy or sociology or psychology, music or graphic arts, history of drama, economics, informatics, biotechnology, electrotechnics, mechanics, materials science). It is possible to choose the second foreign language as one of the elective subjects.

The leaving exam is a centralised affair, conducted by the  National Examination Centre, which is in charge of selecting tasks, appointing national examiners, grading the sheets and sending the scores to all Slovenian universities the applicants have applied for.

Grading is somewhat complicated, as there exist three different criteria for different sets of subjects.

Slovene is unique and is graded on scale of 1 to 8.
It is possible to take mathematics and all foreign languages on a higher or basic level. Basic marks range from 1 to 5, whereas marks for the higher level range from 1 to 8. The examinee may only take up to two subjects on the higher level (two foreign languages, or mathematics and one foreign language).
All other subjects are graded from 1 to 5.

The only failing score is 1; all other scores are passes.

It is also possible to pass the exam with grade 1 in one subject, however, two conditions must be met:
The examinee has achieved at least 80% of the points required for grade 2 on a basic level in this subject, and
The examinee received at least grade 2 in all other subjects, whereof
At least 2 subjects have received grade 3 or higher (if the subject passed with grade 1 is a compulsory subject), or
At least 1 subject has received grade 3 or higher (if the subject passed with grade 1 is an elective subject).

Thus, it is possible to gain from 10 to 34 points. Students who have achieved 30 or more points are awarded leaving exam diplomas cum laude (Slovene: zlata matura 'golden leaving exam') and are usually congratulated by the president of Slovenia at a festive reception in September.

Structure of particular exams:
 Mother tongue – Slovene (Hungarian or Italian for members of minorities respectively)
 Sheet 1: Students write an essay (1000 words) on the two pieces of literature (in 2010: Prišleki by Lojze Kovačič, Dreams of My Russian Summers by Andreï Makine; in 2011: Ločil bom peno od valov by Feri Lainšček and Madame Bovary by Gustave Flaubert). The national committee for Slovene (Državna predmetna komisija za splošno maturo za slovenščino) publishes the titles of the two works the examinees are expected to know one year ahead. This sheet represents 50% of the final score.
 Sheet 2: Students are given an unknown text from a newspaper, magazine etc., followed by some 30 tasks, testing their ability to read, interpret, and understand the text. Also, students' knowledge of Slovene grammar, word-formation and spelling is tested. The last task is to form a certain type of text, being an invitation, a letter of complaint, biography etc. This sheet represents 30% of the final mark.
 Oral exam: A candidate is given three questions. The first two are related to the world literature, whereas the third asks about the historical development of literary Slovene from its beginnings in the year 1551 to the present. It is possible to gain 20%.

The final score is expressed in points from 1 (failure) to 8 (the highest standard of knowledge).
Mathematics
It is possible to take this subject on a higher or basic level.
 Sheet 1: Students are given approximately ten tasks, evaluating their knowledge of different fields in mathematics. This sheet accounts for 53.3% (on a higher level) or 80% (on a basic level).
 Sheet 2 (only on a higher level): Students are given three more difficult tasks. This sheet is worth 26.7%.
 Oral exam: An examinee is given three questions, testing their ability to prove certain theorems or explain some mathematical axioms and definitions.

The final score is expressed in points from 1 (failure) to 5 (the highest mark on a basic level) or 8 (the highest mark on a higher level).
Foreign languages
Chemistry
Information technology, Computer science (separate)
Physics
Geography
History
Sociology, Philosophy, Psychology

The nationwide leaving exam was reintroduced in Slovenia in 1994, after all upper secondary schools had been suspended in the 1980s and reopened in 1991. The exam is conducted in two terms, the first one being in spring (May/June) and the second one in autumn (September). Due to the university admittance procedure, of which the first call concludes in July, applicants passing the exam in September have usually a very limited choice of university programmes for that year.

There has been a heated debate lately whether this leaving exam should once again be completely abolished. As of January 2007, the position of the Ministry of Education remains that the matura will still be the only way of completing secondary education. The decision on whether universities should introduce entrance examinations and reduce the importance of the leaving exam to a mere pass/fail has not been made yet.

In Switzerland

Gymnasiale Matura, Maturité gymnasiale, Maturità liceale
In Switzerland's education system, secondary school has several tiers oriented towards different professional tracks. The gymnasium, leading to the Matura graduation, is the highest tier, offering broad and thorough academic foundations to prepare its students for direct entry to university. Approximately 20% of youth attain the Matura every year, although this figure varies among the different cantons, which are in charge of (upper) secondary education. The gymnasial Matura is required and sufficient (except for medicine, where the number of students is restricted) for Swiss students to study at a university or a federal institute of technology irrespective of their subject choice.

The specific requirements for a Matura graduation vary slightly among the cantons. In general they involve two parts: The grades of the last school year and standardized Matura exams at the end of 12th or 13th grade, depending on the canton. Also a scientific Matura paper of about 25 pages has to be executed. Grades attained in classes during the last school year and at the exams, as well as the Matura paper contribute equally to the final grade. With a revision in 2007, among others an appreciation of science subjects were carried out by individual graduation of biology, physics and chemistry, increasing the proportion of teaching mathematics and natural science subjects as well as the introduction of computer science as a supplementary subject.

6 is the best grade, 1 is the lowest. The required average grade to attain Matura is 4. In order to pass, all grades below 4 have to be compensated by better grades in double, and no more than four grades lower than 4 are allowed.

The cantons are responsible for the organisation of the final tests. Exams include a series of oral and written tests. Tests are typically administered by a team consisting of a teacher who was involved in the student's classes and an independent expert. This cantonal Matura exam is recognised in the whole country but there is no single standardised test on a national level in contrary to what exists in France, for instance where the same test with the same questions and the same themes is passed by all students on the same day.

The gymnasial Matura subjects by federal ordinance (MAV/ORM, SR 413.11) are (Art. 9):

The Matura consists of:
 all 10 or 11 (depends on the canton) basic subjects
 one major subject
 one additional subject
 Matura paper, evaluated by work process, written paper, and oral presentation
 Basic subjects are:
 a first national language, such as French, German, Italian, or Romansh (only in canton of Grisons); including its related literature
 a second national language
 a third language: either a third national language, or English, or a classical language, either Latin or Ancient Greek
 Mathematics
 Biology
 Chemistry
 Physics
 History
 Geography
 Visual Arts or Music
 Cantons (such as Lucerne) may voluntarily provide an additional basic subject: Philosophy
 The major subject is selected from:
 Classic languages (Latin and/or Ancient Greek)
 A modern language (a third national language, English, Spanish, or Russian)
 Physics and Applied Mathematics
 Biology and Chemistry
 Economics and Law
 Philosophy, Education, Psychology
 Visual Arts
 Music
 The additional subject is selected from (must not be equal to major subject):
 Physics
 Chemistry
 Biology
 Applied Mathematics
 Informatics (Computer Science)
 History
 Geography
 Philosophy
 Religion
 Economics and Law
 Education/Psychology
 Visual Arts (excluded, if major subject is either Visual Arts or Music)
 Music (excluded, if major subject is either Visual Arts or Music)
 Sports (excluded, if major subject is either Visual Arts or Music)

The distribution of teaching hours among the subjects must adhere to the following scheme:
 For basic subjects:
 Languages (first, second, and third): 30–40%
 Mathematics and Natural Sciences (Physics, Chemistry and Biology): 25–35%
 Human and Social Sciences (History, Geography, Introduction in Economics and Law, possibly also Philosophy): 10–20%
 Arts (Visual Arts and/or Music): 5–10%
 For major and additional subjects, and Matura paper: 15–25%

Matura exams are executed on at least five of the following subjects (all written exams and optionally also oral):
 The first language
 A second national (or cantonal) Language
 Mathematics
 the major subject
 another subject chosen by cantonal preferences

A Federal Matura exists on a national level, though each Cantonal Matura is also inherently approved on a federal level. The Federal Matura is organised by the State Secretariat for Education, Research and Innovation (SERI) twice a year in each linguistical region.

An additional exam called Latinum Helveticum, also organised by the State Secretariat for Education, Research and Innovation, allows the student to study a field at a university that requires Latin knowledges.

Fachmatura / Maturité de culture générale / Maturità specializzata / Maturita media spezialisada
The Fachmatura/Maturité de culture générale/Maturità specializzata/Maturita media spezialisada is a relatively new program (success rates were first published in 2008).  The exam is taken after completion of a Fachmittelschule and it opens up certain technical college courses.  The program requires successful completion of general education subjects as well as one year of additional training in one or two professional fields and writing a matura paper.  The following fields may be chosen from; health, social work, science, communication and information, music/dance/theater, art and design and education.

Berufsmatura / Maturité professionelle / Maturità professionale
The advanced vocational certificate (Berufsmatura/Maturité professionelle/Maturità professionale) allows access to the Fachhochschule or University of Applied Sciences and indicated both successful completion of the vocational program as well as additional advanced studies.  It can be earned either during the vocation course or after course completion.  Originally there were six specialties in which the certificate could be earned.  Following the new vocational regulations of May 2015 there are now five orientations with two variants for each of the first three; "Technology, Architecture and Life Sciences", "Economics and Services", "Health and Welfare", "Art and Design", and "Nature, Agriculture and Food Services".

In the Ukrainian diaspora
Matura is common in Ukrainian secondary education in the Ukrainian diaspora, specifically in the United States and Canada. It is usually run by Saturday Ukrainian Education schools sponsored by the Ukrainian Congress Committee of America, which regulates and writes the various tests. Children of Ukrainian descent are tested on Saturdays during a month-long period toward the end of their junior or senior year of high school on their knowledge of Ukrainian, geography, history, culture, and literature. Often, these tests are approved by local governments' accreditation standards as a second-language school which can, under certain circumstances, be applied to other schools.

See also
 Baccalaureat
 Bologna process
 High school diploma

References

External links 

 Esame di Stato in Italy 
 Matriculation Certificate in Switzerland
 Matura in Poland
 Matura in Slovakia 
 Matura in Slovakia
 Matura in Bulgaria
 site of CERMAT (in Czech)
 site of State exams in Czech Republic

Education in Austria
Education in Hungary
Education in Italy
Education in Poland
Education in Slovenia
School examinations
School qualifications
Standardized tests
Education in the Czech Republic
Education in Slovakia
Legacy of Yugoslavia
Education in Croatia
Education in Bosnia and Herzegovina
Legacy of Austria-Hungary